United Nations Security Council Resolution 329, adopted unanimously on March 10, 1973, recalled it request to make assistance to Zambia a priority after it risked damaging its economy to uphold resolution 327 against Rhodesia and appealed to all states for immediate technical, financial and material assistance.  The Council requested the Secretary-General to coordinate all the United Nations' agencies in helping Zambia and asked the Economic and Social Council to consider the question of economic assistance to Zambia periodically.

See also
 History of Rhodesia
 List of United Nations Security Council Resolutions 301 to 400 (1971–1976)

References 
Text of the Resolution at undocs.org

External links
 

 0329
 0329
 0329
March 1973 events
Rhodesia–Zambia relations